Chukat-e Abdol Karim Bazar (also Romanized as Chūkāt-e ʿAbdol Karīm Bāzār) is a village in Polan Rural District, Polan District, Chabahar County, Sistan and Baluchestan Province, Iran. At the 2006 census, its population was 132, in 30 families.

References 

Populated places in Chabahar County